Villa Hidalgo Municipality is a municipality in Oaxaca in south-western Mexico. It is part of the Villa Alta District in the center of the Sierra Norte Region.

As of 2020, the municipality had a population of 1,885.

References

Municipalities of Oaxaca